Brian Jason Wilson (born 9 May 1983) is an English former footballer who played as a defender.

Career

Stoke City
Wilson, born in Manchester, England, began his career at Stoke City. Wilson, who could play as a right-sided defender or midfielder, had made a handful of first-team appearances, coming through the youth-team ranks at the Britannia Stadium.

Cheltenham Town
On 13 December 2003, he was loaned to Cheltenham Town on a one-month deal in order to gain experience of first team football. The loan deal was then extended for a further two months in January 2004. Following his loan spell, Wilson sealed a permanent move to Cheltenham on 30 March 2004 on a three-year contract for an undisclosed fee. Wilson made 121 league appearances for Cheltenham, scoring 14 goals.

Bristol City
On 12 January 2007, Wilson signed for Bristol City for an undisclosed fee. Missing much of the 2008–09 season through injury, Wilson made 74 appearances for City, scoring once in the league.

Colchester United
On 29 June 2010, Wilson agreed to join Colchester United after being released by Bristol City, having played just four times for City during the previous season. It was the second time that Colchester manager John Ward had signed Wilson, as Ward signed him while Cheltenham manager in 2003 on loan and signed him permanently a year later. He scored his first goal for Colchester in a 3–2 win over Leyton Orient on 2 November 2010, and his second followed on 6 November 2010 in an FA Cup tie against Bradford City. On 15 May 2012, Wilson signed a two-year contract extension with Colchester, having been ever-present in the 2011–12 season. He became vice-captain during the 2012–13 season and stood in as captain during Kemal Izzet's absence through injury for much of the season. Following Izzet's departure from the club in September 2013, Wilson was named as Colchester's full-time captain on 3 September. Following the announcement of his promotion to club captain, Wilson duly scored in a Football League Trophy tie the same day, opening the scoring with a free kick in a 4–1 defeat against Dagenham & Redbridge.

Oldham Athletic
Wilson joined Oldham Athletic on 10 June 2014 on a two-year contract after turning down the offer of a new contract from Colchester United. On 4 July 2016 Wilson signed a one-year contract extension. He scored his first goal for Oldham in an EFL Trophy tie against Blackburn Rovers Under-23s on 8 November 2016.

He was released by Oldham at the end of the 2017–18 season, following their relegation.

Later career
He signed for Barrow on 16 July 2018. In September 2019 he joined Buxton. Wilson joined Matlock Town in January 2020 as player-assistant manager. Wilson announced his retirement from playing on 1 June 2020.
Wilson appointed manager of Alsager Town in February 2021.

Career statistics

Honours

Club
 Cheltenham Town
 Football League Two Playoff Winner (1): 2005–06

 Bristol City
 Football League One Runner-up (1): 2006–07

References

External links

1983 births
Footballers from Manchester
Living people
Association football midfielders
English footballers
Stoke City F.C. players
Cheltenham Town F.C. players
Bristol City F.C. players
Colchester United F.C. players
Oldham Athletic A.F.C. players
English Football League players
Barrow A.F.C. players
National League (English football) players
Buxton F.C. players
Matlock Town F.C. players